Cerace tetraonis is a species of moth of the family Tortricidae. It is found in China, Pakistan and India.

The wingspan is 25–39 mm. The forewings are black, with dark, brick-red fascia, a row of leaden-metallic round dots throughout and a few black dots before the termen. The markings are pale yellow elsewhere. The hindwings are orange, sometimes turning yellow anteriorly. The markings are blackish.

References

Moths described in 1886
Ceracini